Dagmar Kolesárová (born December 1990)  is a Slovak beauty pageant titleholder who was crowned Miss Universe Slovenskej Republiky 2011 and represented her country in the 2011 Miss Universe pageant.

Early life
A native of Revúca, Kolesárová is pursuing a bachelor's degree at the Faculty of Chemical and Food Technology, Slovak University of Technology in Bratislava.

Miss Universe SR 2011

Miss Universe 2011
As the official representative of her country to the 2011 Miss Universe pageant, broadcast live from São Paulo, Brazil on 12 September 2011, Kolesárová will vie to succeed current Miss Universe titleholder, Ximena Navarrete of Mexico.

References

External links
Official Miss Universe Slovenskej Republiky website

1990 births
Living people
Slovak beauty pageant winners
Miss Universe 2011 contestants
People from Revúca
Slovak University of Technology in Bratislava alumni